Daniel Octobre (10 December 1903 – 19 April 1995) was a French painter. His work was part of the painting event in the art competition at the 1928 Summer Olympics.

References

1903 births
1995 deaths
20th-century French painters
20th-century French male artists
French male painters
Olympic competitors in art competitions
Painters from Paris